Lidlidda, officially the Municipality of Lidlidda, is a 5th class municipality in the province of Ilocos Sur, Philippines. According to the 2020 census, it has a population of 4,705 people.

It is home to the Lidlidda Protected Landscape, a protected area situated in the municipality's watershed.

History
In the year 1800, there lived a group of people called Agsalog (Igorot) in the East Hinterlands of Golot (Mountain Province). Some groups of these people were hospitable, while some were fierce fighters, head hunters, animal rustlers, robbers and the like which worsened the already impoverished state of their place. Tired of such constant inconveniences, the hospitable and peaceful people plotted to leave after holding a secret meeting. They grouped themselves into three: one group to head for the North, another to the South and the third to the West. Being Igorots with customs and traditions firmly instilled by their ancestors, they observed their usual religious rites before starting the journey. A number of chickens were killed and offered to Kabunian (God) and his son Lumawig.  It is a peace offering meant to appease the gods in order not to anger them.  After the ceremony, a safe and peaceful passage to a wonderful land destined especially for them, is expected. The night after the ceremony was held, the peaceful people started their journey.  They moved silently under cover of the tall, thick trees eastward and the shining stars up above served as their guide. The group that traveled to the west were the ones who reached the place, which would be known in the future as Lidlidda. Members of this group had such names as Conay, Caoas, Digay, Caoeng, San-E, Gumanab, Anggon, Calugay and others. Along the way, they met obstacles and hardships associated with the mountainous terrain and the constant feeling of hunger and tiredness. After twenty days of hiking, they arrived in a place that looked suitable for building homes. It was a valley with grassy plains, a river along its sides, creeks, brooks, and wells. There were plenty of fish, wild animals and game for food. The surrounding hills and mountains abundantly covered with tall trees and bamboo could provide them with shade and fruit. The immediate belief that soon a peaceful, progressive and happy community would be positively established in the said place compelled the travelers to stop their seemingly nomadic existence and settle on the area.

They made a begnas (fiesta) to express their gratitude to Kabunian because of their successful journey. Within three days after the fiesta, they started digging and pulling the ledda (Thick tall grasses or ‘Talahib’ in the Tagalog dialect) to convert the land into rice paddies. Years passed and the population increased. The inhabitants started to search further places for food and dwelling. One time, a group of hunters saw smoke near seashore from atop of the mountains west of the place. Eager to see what was there, they bravely hiked to the place. Suddenly they came to reach a street and houses. The people who inhabited the place were Ilokanos, who were also kind and friendly. An elderly rich man met them and told them of his great desire to visit their place.  He said that he wanted to make friends with them as well as barter with their goods.  Furthermore, he wishes to teach religion (Christianity) to the tribe.  In the process, he will teach them the three R's of education: Reading, Writing, and Arithmetic.  The impressionable elderly man's offer was highly appreciated. The rich man along with his neighbors bundled some clothes, utensils, reading and writing materials and went with the hunters. After a few hours, they reached the top of ‘Baggiing Hill’ where they rested. The rich man anxiously asked how far more to go. A hunter stood and said, “Sir, our home is located there at the edge of that plain covered with those ‘Adu nga Ledda’ (many thick tall grasses)”. Then, they hurried down and in a few minutes reached the place. The natives came around and made friends with the strangers. As a show of respect and hospitality, they performed their native dances and songs and offered ricewine along with other delicious and nutritious foods. The rich man and his companions were exhilarated to meet these peaceful people.

Geography

Barangays
Lidlidda is politically subdivided into 11 barangays. These barangays are headed by elected officials: Barangay Captain, Barangay Council, whose members are called Barangay Councilors. All are elected every three years.

 Banucal
 Bequi-Walin
 Bugui
 Calungbuyan
 Carcarabasa
 Labut
 Poblacion Norte (Namatting)
 Poblacion Sur (Surong)
 San Vicente (Kamatliwan)
 Suysuyan
 Tay-ac

Climate

Demographics

In the 2020 census, Lidlidda had a population of 4,705.

Economy

Government
Lidlidda, belonging to the second congressional district of the province of Ilocos Sur, is governed by a mayor designated as its local chief executive and by a municipal council as its legislative body in accordance with the Local Government Code. The mayor, vice mayor, and the councilors are elected directly by the people through an election which is being held every three years.

Elected officials

List of former chief executives
Presidentes
Manog Caoas (1908–1910)
Andan Domaoa (1911–1913)
Miguel Segundo (1914–1916)
Nardo Bagbaguen (1917–1919)
Miguel Segundo (1920–1922)
Cardo Sibanag (1923–1925)
Salioa Salib-O (1926–1928)
Manuel delos Santos (1929–1931)
Bonifacio Tawali (1932–1934)
Dan-E Segundo (1935–1937)
Elmem Manugan (1938–1940)

Municipal Mayors
Basilio Bagbaguen (1941–1943)
Andan Domaoa (1944–1947)
Aurelio Baguso(1948–1955)
Alejo Arola (1956–1959)
Aurelio Baguso (1960–1967)
Tomas Galang(1968–1971)
Aurelio Baguso (1972–1974)
Teodoro Ang-Oay (1974–1979)
Romeo Baguso (1980 to May 28, 1991)
Ponciano Segundo (May 29, 1991 to June 30, 1992)
Jesus M. Sagay (July 1, 1992 – June 30, 2001)
Diokno M. Galang (July 1, 2001 – June 30, 2004)
Jesus M. Sagay (July 1, 2004 – )
Constante Segundo Sr.(July 1, 2010 – June 30, 2013)

Annual events
Lidlidda Day Celebration- being held every 6 January featuring the various cultural songs and dances, native delicacies, indigenous games, and many more, and is actively participated by all townspeople of Lidlidda that even our folks in far places try to find time to come home to personally witness and experience the gracefulness of the celebration. This wonderful event is usually a three-day affair and now popularly known as Buyag Celebration Indeed, the folks as Bago (or Bagbag-o)is now being recognized in the Ilocos and Philippine communities through this celebration, among other Bago cultural festivities entire North Luzon (Philippines).

References

External links
Pasyalang Ilocos Sur
Philippine Standard Geographic Code
Philippine Census Information
Local Governance Performance Management System

Municipalities of Ilocos Sur